Black bean commonly refers to:

 Black turtle bean, a variety of common bean (Phaseolus vulgaris) in Latin American cuisine

Other edible seeds
 Black adzuki bean, a variety of adzuki bean in Korean cuisine
 Black gram (Vigna mungo), a variety of gram (lentil) in South Asian cuisine
 Black soybean, in East Asian cuisine
 Fermented black beans (douchi) used in Chinese cuisine
 Kenyan black bean (Lablab purpureus), used in Kenyan cuisine

Other uses
Black Bean Games, an Italian video game publisher
Castanospermum australe (Moreton Bay Chestnut), a tree with poisonous seeds